Hanaro Card is contactless smart card used in the public transportation system in Busan, South Korea. First used in 1997, the Hanaro Card is now also used for paying at parking lots and toll booths.

The Hanaro system was adopted by Busan City in February 1998.  This created the first integrated transport smart payment system in the world.

References

External links
 Official homepage

Smart cards
Contactless smart cards
Fare collection systems in South Korea
Transport in Busan